Wang Jianmin may refer to:

 Wang Jianmin (full general), former commander of the PLA Nanjing Military Region
 Wang Jianmin (lieutenant general), former deputy political commissar of the PLA Lanzhou Military Region
 Chien-Ming Wang or Wang Jianmin, Taiwanese baseball player
 David C. Wang or Wang Jianmin (王建民), President of Boeing China